The 1987–88 Washington Huskies men's basketball team represented the University of Washington for the 1987–88 NCAA Division I men's basketball season. Led by third-year head coach Andy Russo, the Huskies were members of the Pacific-10 Conference and played their home games on campus at Hec Edmundson Pavilion in Seattle, Washington.

In the Pac-10 tournament at Tucson, Washington was seeded tenth and defeated seventh seed Arizona State by fourteen points in the opening round, then lost to second seed Oregon State by nineteen points in the quarterfinals.

Postseason results

|-
!colspan=5 style=| Pacific-10 Tournament

References

External links
Sports Reference – Washington Huskies: 1987–88 basketball season

Washington Huskies men's basketball seasons
Washington Huskies
Washington
Washington